Mann's worm lizard (Amphisbaena manni), also known commonly as the Hispaniolan dwarf wormlizard, is a species of worm lizard in the family Amphisbaenidae. The species is endemic to the island of Hispaniola.

Etymology
The specific name, manni, is in honor of American entomologist William Montana Mann.

Geographic range
A. manni is found in the Dominican Republic and Haiti.

Habitat
The preferred habitat of A. manni is forest.

Reproduction
A. manni is oviparous.

References

Further reading
Barbour T (1914). "A Contribution to the Zoögeography of the West Indies, with Especial Reference to Amphibians and Reptiles". Memoirs of the Museum of Comparative Zoölogy at Harvard College 44 (2): 205-359 + one plate. (Amphisbaena manni, new species, pp. 318–319).
Gans C, Alexander AA (1962). "Studies on amphisbaenids (Reptilia, Amphisbaenia). 2. On the amphisbaenids of the Antilles". Bulletin of the Museum of Comparative Zoology at Harvard College 128 (3): 65-158 + Plates 1–12. (Amphisbaena manni, pp. 113–121, Figures 22–26).
Schwartz A, Henderson RW (1991). Amphibians and Reptiles of the West Indies: Descriptions, Distributions, and Natural History. Gainesville, Florida: University of Florida Press. 720 pp. . (Amphisbaena manni, p. 561).
Schwartz A, Thomas R (1975). A Check-list of West Indian Amphibians and Reptiles. Carnegie Museum of Natural History Special Publication No. 1. Pittsburgh, Pennsylvania: Carnegie Museum of Natural History. 216 pp. (Amphisbaena manni, p. 168).

Amphisbaena (lizard)
Reptiles described in 1914
Taxa named by Thomas Barbour
Endemic fauna of Hispaniola
Reptiles of the Dominican Republic
Reptiles of Haiti